Super Roots 9 is the eighth installment of Super Roots EPs by Japanese experimental band Boredoms (now known as V∞redoms). This album continues with the previous trends of Boredoms' drum-oriented tribal drone music. It documents a Christmas 2004 show with a 24-member choral ensemble.

Track listing
"Livwe!!" – 40:28

References

Boredoms EPs
2007 EPs